Brothers Grimm is the third album from Western Australian hip hop artist, Drapht. It was released in May 2008 through Australian hip hop label, Obese Records. The album features contributions by Dazastah (Downsyde), Ciecmate (Hospice Crew), Trials & Porsah Laine.

The album debuted at No. 64 on the ARIA Album charts, reached No. 9 on the V Energy AIR (Association of Independent Record Labels) Charts and No. 10 on the ARIA (Australian Recording Industry Association) Top 40 Urban Album charts.

The first single from the album, "Jimmy Recard" has received airplay on radio stations across Australia. In an interview with Triple J, Drapht explained how he came up with the name.I was thinking of successful names so I jumped on the net and actually googled successful names and came up with James and Recard. So I changed James to Jimmy and used Recard as the last name. I think a name does a lot for a character and where you go in life. And it was a positive track on the record because a lot of my stuff kind of feeds from negative ideas.

"Jimmy Recard" and "Falling" both appeared in Triple J's Hottest 100 for 2008 at No. 10 and No. 77 respectively. The song "Don't Wanna Work" appeared in the SBS comedy series "Swift and Shift Couriers".

Track listing

Credits
 M-Phazes — producer (tracks 1, 3 & 10)
 Plutonic Lab — producer (track 11)
 Simplex — producer (track 13)
 Trials — producer
 Neville Clark — mastering
 Dash — artwork

Notes 
'Falling' has since been removed from all copies of the album due to a copyright dispute.

Certifications

References 

2008 albums
Drapht albums
Obese Records albums